Zuzana Ondrášková was the defending champion, but chose not to participate. 
Mona Barthel won the title by defeating Garbiñe Muguruza Blanco in the final 7–5, 6–2.

Seeds

Main draw

Finals

Top half

Bottom half

References
 Main Draw
 Qualifying Draw

TBD Open - Singles
Save Cup
2011 in Italian tennis